Ilanji is a panchayat town in Tenkasi district, in the Indian state of Tamil Nadu. It is located between the towns Tenkasi and Shencottah.

Geography
The word 'Ilanji' has a number of meanings including a water body. The village has three lakes very close to it. This is the only place which receives both south-west and north-east monsoon.

As a result, some people call it "Triplet City" in Tirunelveli district. It is also bounded by two rivers, the Sitraru (Therkaru) and the Kundaru (Vadakkaru). It's also said that at one point in time, a river flowed through the town.

Demographics
In the 2001 Indian census, Ilanji reported a population of 9,423. Males constituted 51% of the population and females 49%. Ilanji had an average literacy rate of 66%, higher than the national average of 59.5%. The male literacy was 75%, and female literacy was 57%. In 2001 in Ilanji, 10% of the population was under 6 years of age.

By the 2011 census, 10,325 people were reported as living in Ilanji.

Government and Politics
It has 3 MLAs for Tenkasi assembly constituency and one district board president for the whole Tirunelveli district which comprised Tuticorin and Trinelveli districts put together at that time.

Economy 
 Timber
 Pottery worlds 
 Agriculture

Transport

Ilanji as said is the centroid of Tenkasi, Senkottai and Courtalam triangle, finds all the buses (that is from Tenkasi to Senkottai) to stop. There are two stops namely Chowkai (buses not going via Courtallam from Tenkasi to Shencottah stop here), Ilanji bus stop (buses going via Courtallam from Tenkasi to Senkottai stop here) which serve as the North and South extremes of the village.

Tourist Spots

 Courtallam (located near to the Ilanji)
 Five falls

Cuisine
Ilanji is also famous for a sweet called "pozhi" which is prepared of dal, jaggery and is prepared without coconut.

In popular culture
Owing to its scenic beauty, Ilanji has featured in many films.
  Winner
  Velai Kidaichuduchu
  Dasarathan
  Iruvar
  Bombay
  Dumm Dumm Dumm
 Vetri Kodi Kattu
 Chennai 600028 II
 Kizhakku Karai
 Guru  -   (Guru's native Ilanji in Tamil version)
 Gentleman
 Punnagai Mannan
 Seema Raja

 Sindhubaadh

Schools

 Ramasamy Pillai Higher Secondary School
 Bharath Montessori Matriculation Higher Secondary School
 Syed Res Mat Higher Secondary School
 English Primary School
 ICI Primary School
 Valli Nayaga Primary School
 T D T A Middle School
 Aramba Jothi Matric School
 Sri Shankara Vidhyalaya School

References

External links
 Images of Ilanji

Cities and towns in Tirunelveli district